Ullock is a village in Cumbria, England, located at National Grid reference NY076239, approximately  south west of Cockermouth and  south east of Workington. The River Marron flows through the village. It is located just outside the Lake District National Park. In 1870-72 the township had a population of 353.

The village was once served by Ullock railway station on the Whitehaven, Cleator and Egremont Railway.

Governance
Ullock is in the parliamentary constituency of Copeland, Trudy Harrison is the Member of Parliament. The former Labour MP for the neighbouring constituency of Workington from 2015-2019, Sue Hayman, was elevated to the House of Lords in 2020 under the title Baroness Hayman of Ullock.

For Local Government purposes it is in the Dalton Ward of Allerdale Borough Council and part of the Cockermouth South Ward of Cumbria County Council.

Ullock does not have its own parish council, instead it is part of Dean Parish Council, which also covers villages of  Dean, Deanscales, Eaglesfield, Pardshaw and Branthwaite.

See also

Listed buildings in Dean, Cumbria

References

External links
  Cumbria County History Trust: Dean (nb: provisional research only - see Talk page)

Villages in Cumbria
Dean, Cumbria